Jackson Mumbwa Kivuva (born August 11, 1989) is a runner from Kenya who specialises in 800 metres. His surname is sometimes misspelled as "Kivuna".

Kivuva started running in 2002 while at Syanamu Primary school. Later he went to Kinyui High School in Kangundo. He is a silver medalist from the 2006 World Junior Championships behind compatriot David Rudisha. The same year he won 800 metres gold at the Africa Zone 5 Junior Championships. He finished fourth at the Kenyan trial for the 2008 Olympics, missing the ticket to Beijing.

He is competing at the 2009 World Championships in Berlin.

Joseph Mutua, who is also an 800m runner, comes from the same village as Kivuva. Jackson is the cousin to Samuel Mutua Kimani

Achievements

References

External links

1989 births
Living people
Kenyan male middle-distance runners
Athletes (track and field) at the 2015 African Games
African Games competitors for Kenya